is a 2005 Japanese mystery horror film written and directed by Shinya Tsukamoto who also stars in the movie. After appearances at several international festivals in 2005, the film debuted theatrically in Japan on March 4, 2006. Two versions of the film exist: the original release, a short 25-minute version; and what Director Tsukamoto titled the "Long Version", which runs 49 minutes.

Plot

A man wakes up in a small concrete space bleeding from the abdomen. He can barely move and has no recollection of why or how he came to be there. Crawling forward he eventually meets a woman and they try to piece together their past lives.

Cast
Shinya Tsukamoto

Masato Tsujioka

Reception

Keith Uhlich from Slant Magazine awarded the film three and a half out of four stars, writing, "Many directors would no doubt take a god’s-eye perspective of Haze'''s hero, but Tsukamoto favors an intimate camera style that offsets the genre film sturm und drang and grounds his movie in a terrifyingly mortal perspective." Niina Doherty from HorrorNews.net'' gave the film a positive review, praising the film's claustrophobic atmosphere, sound design, and cinematography.

References

External links
 
 
 
 

2005 films
2005 horror films
Films directed by Shinya Tsukamoto
Films scored by Chu Ishikawa
Japanese mystery horror films
2000s Japanese-language films
2000s mystery horror films
2000s Japanese films